Tucker County Bank Building is a historic bank building located at Parsons, Tucker County, West Virginia. It was built in 1901, and is a three-story brick commercial building with a rusticated ashlar base and accents in the Romanesque Revival style. It features a corner turret with angled entrance.  The building housed the Tucker County Bank until 1969.  Over time, it also housed a Masonic Lodge, the Board of Education, a telephone company, doctor's offices, law firms, insurance agencies, a bus depot, a soda fountain and a drug store.

It was listed on the National Register of Historic Places in 2010.

References

Bank buildings on the National Register of Historic Places in West Virginia
Romanesque Revival architecture in West Virginia
Commercial buildings completed in 1901
Buildings and structures in Tucker County, West Virginia
National Register of Historic Places in Tucker County, West Virginia
1901 establishments in West Virginia